Maik Kegel (born 8 December 1989) is a German footballer who plays as an attacking midfielder for Fortuna Köln.

Career
Kegel began his career with Dynamo Dresden and was promoted to the first team during the 2007–08 season, and made an immediate impact, making his debut against Hamburger SV II, where he scored just five minutes after coming on as a substitute for Pavel David. In his five years with Dynamo, Kegel made 90 league appearances, scoring eight goals and helped the club earn promotion to the 2. Bundesliga in 2011. He joined Chemnitzer FC in July 2012, along with teammate Sascha Pfeffer. Two years later he signed for Holstein Kiel.

In summer 2016, Kegel moved to Fortuna Köln. A few months after his arrival, Kegel tore his cruciate ligament and for that reason, he only played seven league games in that season. In March 2019, Kegel tore his cruciate ligament once again and wasn't offered a new contract, why he left the club at the end of the season. 

However, Kegel returned to the club in March 2020, after being without club since leaving the club in the summer 2019.

Career statistics

References

External links

 

1989 births
Living people
Footballers from Dresden
German footballers
Germany youth international footballers
Association football midfielders
Dynamo Dresden players
Dynamo Dresden II players
Chemnitzer FC players
Holstein Kiel players
SC Fortuna Köln players
2. Bundesliga players
3. Liga players
Regionalliga players